Sun Heping, may refer to:

 Sun Heping (diplomat)
 Sun Heping (scientist)